State Square was the central square of antebellum Atlanta, Georgia. The original Atlanta Union Depot designed by Edward A. Vincent stood in the middle of the square. The square was bounded by Marietta Street (now Decatur Street) on the northeast, Pryor Street on the northwest, Loyd Street (now Central Avenue) on the southeast, and Alabama Street on the south. The square was surrounded by Atlanta's most important buildings including the hotels Atlanta, Trout House, and Washington Hall, the Atlanta Bank, retail stores, and warehouses.

The area is now almost entirely taken up by parking lots and parking garages, with a portion occupied by the Georgia State University College of Education, MARTA rail line, and retail and office space lining the north side of Alabama Street.

References

 Robert Scott Davis, Civil War Atlanta, p.20
 M. Thomas Inge, High Times and Hard Times, p.86
 Seignious v. Metropolitan Atlanta Rapid Transit Authority and Cotter et al. v. Metropolitan Atlanta Rapid Transit Authority, Georgia caselaw
 ATLhistory.com

History of Atlanta
Roads in Atlanta